A list of horror films released in 2002.

References

External links
 Most Popular Horror features films released in 2002 on IMDb

Lists of horror films by year
2002-related lists
The Others